Pseudamnicola chia is a species of very small freshwater snail with an operculum, an aquatic gastropod mollusc in the family Hydrobiidae.

Geographic distribution 
P. chia is endemic to Greece, where it is only known from four springs on the island of Chios.

References

Hydrobiidae
Gastropods of Europe
Endemic fauna of Greece
Gastropods described in 1889